The 500 metres distance for women in the 2009–10 ISU Speed Skating World Cup was contested over 12 races on six occasions, out of a total of seven World Cup occasions for the season, with the first occasion taking place in Berlin, Germany, on 6–8 November 2009, and the final occasion taking place in Heerenveen, Netherlands, on 12–14 March 2010.

Jenny Wolf of Germany successfully defended her title, while Margot Boer of the Netherlands repeated her second place from the previous season. Wang Beixing of China came third.

On the fifth competition weekend, in Salt Lake City, Wolf set a new world record of 37.00.

Top three

Race medallists

Final standings
''Standings as of 14 March 2010 (end of the season).

References

Women 0500
ISU